Heritage Adventurer  is an ice-strengthened expedition cruise ship built in 1991 by Rauma shipyard in Finland. She was originally named Society Adventurer, but after Discoverer Reederei was unable to take delivery of the vessel due to financial troubles, the completed ship was laid up at the shipyard for almost two years. In 1993, she was acquired by Hanseatic Tours (which later merged with Hapag-Lloyd) and renamed Hanseatic. In 2018, she was chartered to One Ocean Expeditions and renamed RCGS Resolute. In 2021, she was acquired by Heritage Expeditions and, following an extensive refit, given her current name.

General characteristics 

Her gross tonnage is 8,445; net tonnage 2,573; and deadweight tonnage 1,177 tonnes. The ship's hull and propulsion system are strengthened for navigation in ice-covered waters according to the Germanischer Lloyd ice class notation E4, which is equivalent to the highest Finnish-Swedish ice class for merchant ships, 1A Super.

Originally built to cater to the five-star luxury cruise market, interiors on Heritage Adventurers six passenger-accessible decks were designed by the German architect Wilfried Köhnemann. The vessel has 88 outside cabins and, above the bridge deck, four suites for a total of 184 passengers served by a crew of 125. Public spaces include a restaurant, multiple lounges, and a 78-seat theater. The ship carries 14 Zodiac inflatable boats to take passengers ashore during expedition cruises.

The ship's propulsion system consists of two eight-cylinder MaK 8M453C four-stroke medium-speed diesel engines, each rated  at 600rpm, driving two controllable pitch propellers. Onboard electrical power is generated by two  six-cylinder MaK 6M332 auxiliary diesel generators and two  main engine driven shaft generators. For maneuvering in ports, the ship has a  transverse bow thruster.

Career

Society Adventurer 

In December 1989, the German cruise ship company Discoverer Reederei decided to order a $75 million expedition cruise ship for its US-based subsidiary Society Expeditions. The shipbuilding contract was awarded to Rauma Yards, a new Finnish company established in August of the same year following the disbanding of Rauma-Repola's shipyard group. The ship, launched on 5 January 1991 as Society Adventurer, was intended for adventure-style cruises to remote destinations such as Antarctica and had, among other features, an ice-strengthened hull. However, Discoverer Reederei was unable to take delivery of the vessel in the following summer due to financial troubles and also had to cancel a sister ship that had already been contracted. As a result, the ownership of the vessel was transferred to Rauma Yards's newly established Bahamas-registered subsidiary, Society Adventurer Shipping Company, on 7 June 1991. Later that year, Rauma Yards was merged with another local shipbuilder, Hollming, as Finnyards. While on a lay-up at the yard, Society Adventurer was inspected by a number of parties interested in acquiring the vessel, among them the future president of the United States Donald Trump who visited Rauma in 1992.

Hanseatic 

In 1993, the ship was chartered and shortly afterwards purchased by the German expedition cruise operator Hanseatic Tours. The company had been established two years earlier by Dirk Moldenhauer, who had been the last captain of German Atlantic Line's cruise ship Hanseatic in 1973 and later acquired rights to the classic Hamburg Atlantic Line logo, livery and the name "Hanseatic". Society Adventurer was renamed Hanseatic on 23 March 1993, becoming the fourth ship to bear the name, and the original blue-yellow-white Discoverer Reederei livery was replaced with the white hull and red decorative stripes. The vessel's maiden cruise from Hamburg to Sevilla began on 27 March 1993. When Hanseatic Tours was merged with Hapag-Lloyd Cruises in 1997, Hanseatic retained her original name as well as Hamburg Atlantic Line livery and funnel logo until rebranding in 2011.

Hanseatic remained in Hapag-Lloyd's fleet until 2018. Over the ship's 25-year career and a total of 667 cruises, she made 128 expeditions to Antarctica, two voyages to the Northern Sea Route (Northeast Passage), and transited the full length of the Northwest Passage 11 times. The latter is a record number for passenger ships, exceeded only by the Russian icebreaker Kapitan Khlebnikov which is also used for expedition cruises. Hanseatic also holds the record for having been further north among passenger-carrying ships that are not icebreakers: on 26 August 2014, the vessel reached ,  from the North Pole, due to unusually easy ice conditions in the Russian Arctic at that time.

RCGS Resolute 

In June 2017, the Canada-based cruise ship operator One Ocean Expeditions announced that it would expand its fleet of expedition cruise ships with a long-term charter of the former Hanseatic.

The ship would be renamed RCGS Resolute after the 1850-built Royal Navy Arctic exploration vessel HMS Resolute as well as the Inuit hamlet Resolute in Nunavut. Furthermore, the ship would carry the initials of the Royal Canadian Geographical Society (RCGS) with whom One Ocean Expeditions had partnered. After concluding her career with Hapag-Lloyd, the vessel was drydocked at Blohm+Voss shipyard in Hamburg, Germany where a so-called duck tail sponson was added to the stern. In October 2018, she headed to Canada under her new name and a Portuguese flag, and with a new livery.

In 2019, the company's financial difficulties began to surface with the sudden withdrawal of the Russian research vessels Akademik Ioffe and Akademik Sergey Vavilov chartered from the Shirshov Institute of Oceanology. Although One Ocean Expeditions initially called the Russian owner's action a contract violation, it was later revealed that the company had failed to pay charter and fueling fees to the intermediate charterer Terragelida Ship Management which had then terminated the contract. This left One Ocean Expeditions with just one ship, RCGS Resolute. In August, she was briefly arrested in Iqaluit over a C$100,000 payment dispute. While this issue was reportedly solved quickly, another arrest over non-payment of services and crew wages followed in Halifax next month. Finally, in October One Ocean Expeditions was forced to cancel an Antarctic cruise midway after the vessel could not be refueled due to the company's non-payment of outstanding debts. Shortly after the ship's 140 passengers disembarked, RCGS Resolute was detained in Buenos Aires over "significant debt". The company entered administration in January 2020.

On 5 March 2020, RCGS Resolute left Buenos Aires after the ship's registered owner, Bunnys Adventure & Cruise Shipping Company Limited, paid a total of US$3.6 million of One Ocean Expeditions's outstanding debt to fuel suppliers, ship agents and crew members in order to avoid a court-ordered sale of the vessel. However, in June 2020 it was reported that RCGS Resolute would be sold in an auction in Curaçao to cover the shipowner's nearly $4 million debt. The ship was reportedly sold for $600,000 on 22 June 2020.

Heritage Adventurer 

In 2021, Heritage Expeditions announced that it had acquired the vessel and, following an extensive refit, will begin offering cruises from May 2022 onwards under the name Heritage Adventurer.

Incidents

1996 grounding 

On 29 August 1996, Hanseatic ran aground in Simpson Strait in the Canadian Arctic. The vessel was eleven days into an eastbound transit along the Northwest Passage with 149 passengers and 110 crew, and had stopped at Gjoa Haven to let passengers ashore.

With no danger of the vessel sinking, Hanseatics passengers were allowed to explore the nearby islands using the ship's boats until the Russian icebreaker Kapitan Dranitsyn arrived to pick up the passengers on 5 September and continue the Northwest Passage expedition under charter by Hanseatic Tours. Hanseatic itself was successfully refloated on 8 September. While the ship's hull was damaged during the grounding, no oil spilled to the sea and there were no injuries among the passengers or the crew.

1997 grounding 

On 14 July 1997, Hanseatic was grounded on a sand bank in Murchisonfjorden in Svalbard with 145 passengers on board. No injuries nor damage to the ship was reported, and the passengers were again taken to explore nearby islands on Hanseatics Zodiac boats while awaiting evacuation. By 17 July, the ship had been refloated and was heading towards Longyearbyen for inspection.

2005 grounding 

In August 2005, Hanseatic ran aground near the island of Lurøya on the Norwegian coast, just south of the Arctic Circle, with 160 passengers on board. While the vessel was not in danger of sinking despite a  hole in one of her ballast water tank, the passengers and part of the crew was nonetheless evacuated.

2013 drydock fire 

On 13 June 2013, a fire broke out in Hanseatics engine room due to hot work in one of the ballast water tanks while the ship was in a drydock at the Bredo Shipyard in Bremerhaven. Due to delays in drydocking and additional repairs required by the fire, four cruises between 17 June and 1 August had to be cancelled.

2020 collision with Venezuelan patrol boat Naiguatá 

On 30 March 2020, RCGS Resolute was involved in an incident off the Venezuelan coast which led to the sinking of the Venezuelan Coast Guard patrol boat  (GC-23) following a collision with the cruise ship.

Initial reports 

In a statement released by Venezuela on 31 March, RCGS Resolute was accused of committing an act of "aggression and piracy" by intentionally ramming and sinking Naiguatá while the patrol boat was conducting a maritime traffic control operation, as well as of acting "cowardly and criminal" for not participating in the search and rescue of the patrol boat's crew of 44, all of which were rescued by other Venezuelan vessels. An illustration of the incident released by the Venezuelan Navy describes RCGS Resolute turning hard starboard to ram Naiguatá while the patrol boat was sailing alongside the cruise ship. Video footage later released by the Venezuelan Navy first show a Naiguatá crewman firing warning shots with an AK-47 assault rifle, followed by the patrol boat taking water after colliding with the RCGS Resolutes visibly damaged bow. In addition, Venezuela has also alleged that Portuguese-flagged RCGS Resolute was carrying mercenaries for attacking the country's military bases and that the ship's inflatable Zodiac boats were intended to transport them to shore.

RCGS Resolute, which had left Buenos Aires on 5 March, had been adrift in the open sea for a day while carrying out routine maintenance on the starboard main engine before reaching her next destination, Willemstad in Curaçao. After having questioned her intentions over radio, the Venezuelan Coast Guard vessel ordered RCGS Resolute to follow her to Puerto Moreno on the eastern side of Margarita Island. While the master was in contact with the company's head office and designated person ashore (DPA), warning shots were fired from Naiguatá and, shortly afterwards, the Venezuelan patrol boat purposely rammed the cruise ship's starboard bow. During an apparent attempt to change the heading of RCGS Resolute towards Venezuelan territorial waters, Naiguatá came in contact with the cruise ship's ice-strengthened bulbous bow, started to take water, and eventually sank. RCGS Resolute, which had a crew of 32 onboard but was not carrying passengers, survived the encounter with superficial damage and remained on site for over an hour to provide assistance until being allowed to continue towards Willemstad by Joint Rescue Coordination Centre (JRCC) Curaçao.

Portuguese investigation 
On 6 April, the Office for the Investigation of Maritime Accidents and the Aeronautical Meteorology Authority ( or GAMA) of Portugal released a technical investigation report on the incident involving the Portuguese-flagged cruise ship.

According to the report, RCGS Resolute had departed Buenos Aires on 5 March and sailed to the Caribbean Sea along the South American coastline. On 28 March, the vessel had stopped in the open sea to allow the crew to carry out maintenance work in the engine room. After drifting closer to the Venezuelan coast on the following day, RCGS Resolute had resumed sailing west for about 90 minutes until the ship had passed La Tortuga Island and then continued adrift to a westerly direction while the starboard main engine turbocharger was being serviced.

On the night of 30 March, RCGS Resolute was contacted by the Venezuelan Coast Guard patrol boat Naiguatá at around quarter past midnight. After a brief questioning over VHF Marine band radio, the cruise ship was ordered to follow the Venezuelan vessel to Puerto Moreno on the basis that the Portuguese-flagged vessel was violating Venezuelan territorial waters. After consulting with the company designated person ashore (DPA), RCGS Resolute announced that the vessel would start engines and resume voyage to Curaçao.

At around 01:05 local time, Naiguatá approached RCGS Resolute from the starboard quarter and, after suddenly changing course to port, collided with the bow of the cruise ship.  A few minutes later, RCGS Resolutes master ordered the port side controllable pitch propeller first to zero pitch and then to astern thrust in order to separate the vessels. The company DPA instructed the cruise ship to remain on site and contact the local Maritime Rescue Coordination Centre (MRCC). At 01:38, about half an hour after the collision, Naiguatás AIS-SART was activated but RCGS Resolute was unable to establish contact with the sinking Venezuelan vessel over the radio and instead contacted JRCC Curaçao. About one hour later, the Venezuelan crew was seen preparing liferafts for launching. At 02:43, JRCC Curaçao relayed a statement from the Venezuelan authority responsible for the region, MRCC La Guaira, that RCGS Resolutes assistance was no longer needed on site and instructed the cruise ship to proceed to Willemstad in order to avoid problems with the Venezuelan Navy.

Although the Portuguese authorities have not obtained statements from Venezuela, the report discusses the possibility that the unexpected change in Naiguatás heading just before the collision, as reported by RCGS Resolute, may have been caused by a suction effect between the vessels as the faster patrol boat passed the bow of the cruise ship. Although the collision may have not been intentional ramming, the conclusion was nonetheless that the incident that led to the sinking of Naiguatá was a deliberate act initiated by the Venezuelan Navy rather than an accidental occurrence.

References

Cruise ships
1991 ships
Ships built in Rauma, Finland
Merchant ships of the Bahamas
Merchant ships of Portugal
Maritime incidents in 1996
Maritime incidents in 1997
Maritime incidents in 2005
Maritime incidents in 2013
Maritime incidents in 2020